Jablanica is a village situated in Novi Pazar municipality in Serbia.

References

Populated places in Raška District